Jayden Goodwin (born 13 December 2001) is an Australian cricketer. He made his first-class debut on 10 November 2021, for Western Australia in the 2021–22 Sheffield Shield season.

His father, Murray, played Test cricket for Zimbabwe.

After playing for Western Australia at age division levels, Goodwin decided to take a two year break from cricket in 2019 to fulfil his Mormon Mission in Zimbabwe. However he returned to Australia in 2020 due to the travel restrictions amidst the COVID-19 pandemic, and made his first-class debut the following year. He replaced Sam Whiteman in the squad, who was ruled out due to delayed onset concussion.

References

External links
 

2001 births
Living people
Australian cricketers
Western Australia cricketers
Place of birth missing (living people)